Gonadotropin-releasing hormone (GnRH) is a releasing hormone responsible for the release of follicle-stimulating hormone (FSH) and luteinizing hormone (LH) from the anterior pituitary. GnRH is a tropic peptide hormone synthesized and released from GnRH neurons within the hypothalamus. The peptide belongs to gonadotropin-releasing hormone family. It constitutes the initial step in the hypothalamic–pituitary–gonadal axis.

Structure
The identity of GnRH was clarified by the 1977 Nobel Laureates Roger Guillemin and Andrew V. Schally:

pyroGlu-His-Trp-Ser-Tyr-Gly-Leu-Arg-Pro-Gly-NH2
As is standard for peptide representation, the sequence is given from amino terminus to carboxyl terminus; also standard is omission of the designation of chirality, with assumption that all amino acids are in their L- form. The abbreviations are the standard abbreviations for the corresponding proteinogenic amino acids, except for pyroGlu, which refers to pyroglutamic acid, a derivative of glutamic acid. The NH2 at the carboxyl terminus indicates that rather than terminating as a free carboxylate, it terminates as a carboxamide.

Synthesis
The gene, GNRH1, for the GnRH precursor is located on chromosome 8. In mammals, the linear decapeptide end-product is synthesized from an 89-amino acid preprohormone in the preoptic anterior hypothalamus. It is the target of various regulatory mechanisms of the hypothalamic–pituitary–gonadal axis, such as being inhibited by increased estrogen levels in the body.

Function
GnRH is secreted in the hypophysial portal bloodstream at the median eminence. The portal blood carries the GnRH to the pituitary gland, which contains the gonadotrope cells, where GnRH activates its own receptor, gonadotropin-releasing hormone receptor (GnRHR), a seven-transmembrane G-protein-coupled receptor that stimulates the beta isoform of Phosphoinositide phospholipase C, which goes on to mobilize calcium and protein kinase C. This results in the activation of proteins involved in the synthesis and secretion of the gonadotropins LH and FSH. GnRH is degraded by proteolysis within a few minutes.

GnRH activity is very low during childhood, and is activated at puberty or adolescence. During the reproductive years, pulse activity is critical for successful reproductive function as controlled by feedback loops. However, once a pregnancy is established, GnRH activity is not required. Pulsatile activity can be disrupted by hypothalamic-pituitary disease, either dysfunction (i.e., hypothalamic suppression) or organic lesions (trauma, tumor). Elevated prolactin levels decrease GnRH activity. In contrast, hyperinsulinemia increases pulse activity leading to disorderly LH and FSH activity, as seen in polycystic ovary syndrome (PCOS). GnRH formation is congenitally absent in Kallmann syndrome.

Control of FSH and LH
At the pituitary, GnRH stimulates the synthesis and secretion of follicle-stimulating hormone (FSH) and luteinizing hormone (LH). These processes are controlled by the size and frequency of GnRH pulses, as well as by feedback from androgens and estrogens. Low-frequency GnRH pulses are required for FSH release, whereas high-frequency GnRH pulses stimulate LH pulses in a one-to-one manner.

There are differences in GnRH secretion between females and males. In males, GnRH is secreted in pulses at a constant frequency; however, in females, the frequency of the pulses varies during the menstrual cycle, and there is a large surge of GnRH just before ovulation.

GnRH secretion is pulsatile in all vertebrates, and is necessary for correct reproductive function. Thus, a single hormone, GnRH1, controls a complex process of follicular growth, ovulation, and corpus luteum maintenance in the female, and spermatogenesis in the male.

Neurohormone
GnRH is considered a neurohormone, a hormone produced in a specific neural cell and released at its neural terminal. A key area for production of GnRH is the preoptic area of the hypothalamus, which contains most of the GnRH-secreting neurons. GnRH neurons originate in the nose and migrate into the brain, where they are scattered throughout the medial septum and hypothalamus and connected by very long >1-millimeter-long dendrites. These bundle together so they receive shared synaptic input, a process that allows them to synchronize their GnRH release.

The GnRH neurons are regulated by many different afferent neurons, using several different transmitters (including norepinephrine, GABA, glutamate). For instance, dopamine appears to stimulate LH release (through GnRH) in estrogen-progesterone-primed females; dopamine may inhibit LH release in ovariectomized females. Kisspeptin appears to be an important regulator of GnRH release. GnRH release can also be regulated by estrogen. It has been reported that there are kisspeptin-producing neurons that also express estrogen receptor alpha.

Other organs
GnRH is found in organs outside of the hypothalamus and pituitary, and its role in other life processes is poorly understood. For instance, there is likely to be a role for GnRH1 in the placenta and in the gonads. GnRH and GnRH receptors are also found in cancers of the breast, ovary, prostate, and endometrium.

Effects of behavior
GnRH production/release is one of the few confirmed examples of behavior influencing hormones, rather than the other way around. Cichlid fish that become socially dominant in turn experience an upregulation of GnRH secretion whereas cichlid fish that are socially subordinate have a down regulation of GnRH secretion. Besides secretion, the social environment as well as their behavior affects the size of GnRH neurons. Specifically, males that are more territorial have larger GnRH neurons than males that are less territorial. Differences are also seen in females, with brooding females having smaller GnRH neurons than either spawning or control females. These examples suggest that GnRH is a socially regulated hormone.

Multiple neuronal regions in the limbic system send signals to the hypothalamus to modulate the amount of GnRH production and the frequency of pulses. This provides a possible explanation for why psychic influences typically affect female sexual function.

Medical uses

Natural GnRH was previously prescribed as gonadorelin hydrochloride (Factrel) and gonadorelin diacetate tetrahydrate (Cystorelin) for use in treating human diseases. Modifications of the decapeptide structure of GnRH to increase half life have led to GnRH1 analog medications that either stimulate (GnRH1 agonists) or suppress (GnRH antagonists) the gonadotropins. These synthetic analogs have replaced the natural hormone in clinical use.

Its analogue leuprorelin is used for continuous infusion, to treat breast cancer, endometriosis, prostate cancer, and following research in the 1980s by researchers, including Dr. Florence Comite of Yale University, it was used to treat precocious puberty.

A Cochrane Review is available which investigates whether GnRH analogues, given before or alongside chemotherapy, could prevent damage to women's ovaries caused by chemotherapy. GnRH agonists appear to be effective in protecting the ovaries during chemotherapy, in terms of menstruation recovery or maintenance, premature ovarian failure and ovulation.

Animal sexual behavior
GnRH activity influences a variety of sexual behaviors. Increased levels of GnRH facilitate sexual displays and behavior in females. GnRH injections enhance copulation solicitation (a type of courtship display) in white-crowned sparrows. In mammals, GnRH injections facilitate sexual behavior of female display behaviors as shown with the musk shrew’s (Suncus murinus) reduced latency in displaying rump presents and tail wagging towards males.

An elevation of GnRH raises males’ testosterone capacity beyond a male's natural testosterone level.  Injections of GnRH in male birds immediately after an aggressive territorial encounter results in higher testosterone levels than is observed naturally during an aggressive territorial encounter.

A compromised GnRH system has adverse effects on reproductive physiology and maternal behavior.  In comparison to female mice with a normal GnRH system, female mice with a 30% decrease in GnRH neurons are poor caregivers to their offspring.  These mice are more likely to leave their pups scattered rather than grouped together, and will take significantly longer to retrieve their pups.

Veterinary use

The natural hormone is also used in veterinary medicine as a treatment for cattle with cystic ovarian disease. The synthetic analogue deslorelin is used in veterinary reproductive control through a sustained-release implant.

Other names
As with many hormones, GnRH has been called by various names in the medical literature over the decades since its existence was first inferred. They are as follows:
 Gonadotropin-releasing factor (GnRF, GRF); Gonadotropin-releasing hormone (GnRH, GRH)
 Follicle-stimulating hormone-releasing factor (FRF, FSH-RF); Follicle-stimulating hormone-releasing hormone (FRH, FSH-RH)
 Luteinizing hormone-releasing factor (LRF, LHRF); Luteinizing hormone-releasing hormone (LRH, LHRH)
 Follicle-stimulating hormone and luteinizing hormone–releasing factor (FSH/LH-RF); Follicle-stimulating hormone and luteinizing hormone-releasing hormone (FSH/LH-RH)
 Luteinizing hormone and follicle-stimulating hormone–releasing factor (LH/FSH-RF); Luteinizing hormone and follicle-stimulating hormone-releasing hormone (LH/FSH-RH)
 Gonadorelin (INN for pharmaceutical form)
 Gonadoliberin

See also
 Gonadotropin-releasing hormone receptor § Agonists
 GnRH modulator
 Progonadotropin
 Gonadotropin surge-attenuating factor
 GNRH2, a similar gene
 Gonadotropin-inhibitory hormone
 Breastfeeding and fertility

References

Further reading

External links 
 

Animal reproductive system
Antigonadotropins
Gonadotropin-releasing hormone and gonadotropins
Hormones of the hypothalamus-pituitary-gonad axis
Human female endocrine system
Peptide hormones
Precursor proteins
Progonadotropins
Sex hormones
World Anti-Doping Agency prohibited substances